Lina Sarmiento (born 1958) is the first female third-level official of the Philippine National Police to receive and hold the rank of director, a rank equivalent to that of a major general in the Philippine military. At this two-star rank level, Sarmiento became the head of the PNP’s Community Relations Group on June 22, 2012 at the age of 53, a part of the PNP Directorial Staff.  Before this post, Sarmiento was a chief superintendent.

Biography
As a graduate student with a bachelor's degree in Chemistry, Sarmiento started in her career as policewoman as a forensic chemist in the police service, by joining the Philippine National Police in 1980. She later held other positions in the PNP Crime Laboratory, Directorate for Operations, Police Regional Office and the Philippine Drug Enforcement Agency. She later became Director of the PNP Human Rights Affairs Office and the Police Security and Protection Group. Sarmiento was also a graduate student with a degree in Law. Sarmiento was neither a member of both the Philippine Military Academy (PMA) and the Philippine National Police Academy (PNP Academy).

Personal life
Sarmiento is married to her husband Avelino. She has four children, namely Mark Alvin, Matthew Allen, April Madeline, and Aylene Marie.

See also
Women in the Philippine National Police
Women in the Philippine military

References

External links

Another ‘first’ for a Filipino woman by Rina Jimenez-David, Philippine Daily Inquirer, June 23, 2012

Filipino police officers
Women police officers
1958 births
Living people